Ryania speciosa var. mutisii is an extinct plant of Colombia, a variety of Ryania speciosa.

References

Salicaceae
Extinct plants
Flora of Colombia